Sidi Sané (born 21 April 2003) is a German professional footballer who plays as a winger for Bundesliga club Schalke 04.

Career
Sané made his professional debut for Schalke 04 in the DFB-Pokal on 31 July 2022, coming on as a substitute in the 73rd minute in a 5–0 away win against Bremer SV.

Personal life
Sané is the younger brother of German international player Leroy Sané, who also started his professional football career at Schalke 04, and the son of former German rhythmic gymnast and 1984 Summer Olympics bronze medalist Regina Weber, and former footballer and Senegalese international Souleymane Sané.

Career statistics

References

External links
 Profile at DFB.de
 Profile at kicker.de

2003 births
Living people
Footballers from Essen
German footballers
Association football wingers
FC Schalke 04 players
FC Schalke 04 II players
Bundesliga players
Regionalliga players
German people of Senegalese descent
German sportspeople of African descent